Tanganyika may refer to:

Places
 Tanganyika Territory (1916–1961), a former British territory which preceded the sovereign state
 Tanganyika (1961–1964), a sovereign state, comprising the mainland part of present-day Tanzania
 Tanzania Mainland, the current area of the former country state and territory of Tanganyika
 Lake Tanganyika, an African Great Lake
 Tanganyika Province, a province in the Democratic Republic of the Congo
 Tanganika District, a former district of Katanga Province that became Tanganyika Province in 2015

Other uses

 Tanganyika (film), a 1954 action adventure film
 Tanganyika (album), a 1956 album by Buddy Collette
 HMS Tanganyika, an

See also

 United Republic of Tanganyika and Zanzibar, the predecessor of Tanzania
 
 Tanzania (disambiguation)